Muli may refer to:

Places
Muli Tibetan Autonomous County, Sichuan, China
Muli, Gaoqing County (木李镇), town in Gaoqing County, Shandong, China
Múli, a village on Borðoy, in the Faroe Islands
Muli, Gujarat, a city and municipality in the state of Gujarat, India
Muli, Kermanshah, a village in Iran
Muli, Khuzestan, a village in Iran
Muli, Meemu Atoll, the main town on Meemu Atoll, Maldives
Muli station, a metro station in Suzhou, China
Muli (Tuvalu), a village in Tuvalu
Muli (Traditional Shelter), Aboriginal word

Other uses
Muli (name)
Muli (also mooli), the Hindi name for white radish
Muli (TV series), a Malaysian-Filipino television series 
Muli (film), a Filipino film
Mullo (vampire), a creature from Roma (Gypsy) mythology
Muli (song), a OPM song